Aldo Andrés Mores (born 13 January 1982) is a former Argentine footballer who last played for ViOn Zlaté Moravce.

Omoefe started his senior career at Boca Juniors, and has since played in Indonesia, Malaysia, Bolivia, Peru, the Czech Republic and Slovakia.

References

1983 births
Living people
Sportspeople from Córdoba Province, Argentina
Argentine footballers
Argentine expatriate footballers
Club Bolívar players
Club Deportivo Universidad de San Martín de Porres players
Czech First League players
FK Viktoria Žižkov players
FC ViOn Zlaté Moravce players
Slovak Super Liga players
Expatriate footballers in Indonesia
Expatriate footballers in Malaysia
Expatriate footballers in Bolivia
Argentine expatriate sportspeople in Peru
Expatriate footballers in Peru
Expatriate footballers in the Czech Republic
Expatriate footballers in Slovakia
Argentine expatriate sportspeople in Bolivia
Argentine expatriate sportspeople in Indonesia
Argentine expatriate sportspeople in Malaysia
Argentine expatriate sportspeople in Slovakia
Argentine expatriate sportspeople in the Czech Republic
Association football defenders